Huntington Park is a city in the Gateway Cities district of southeastern Los Angeles County, California.

As of the 2010 census, the city had a total population of 58,114, of whom 97% are Hispanic/Latino and about half were born outside the U.S.

In 2019, Huntington Park was ranked lowest in California and 10th-worst nationally on a so-called “misery index”, based on census data compiled by Business Insider, due to factors such as low household income. Nonetheless, Huntington Park and its Pacific Boulevard area are a busy and dynamic hub of the mostly Hispanic, working-class inner Southeast L.A. area.

History 

Named for prominent industrialist Henry E. Huntington, Huntington Park was incorporated in 1906 as a streetcar suburb on the Los Angeles Railway for workers in the rapidly expanding industries to the southeast of downtown Los Angeles. To this day, about 30% of its residents work at factories in nearby Vernon and Commerce.  The stretch of Pacific Boulevard in downtown Huntington Park was a major commercial district serving the city's largely working-class residents as well as being the retail hub of Southeast Los Angeles County. As with most of the other cities along the corridor stretching along the Los Angeles River to the south and southeast of downtown Los Angeles, Huntington Park was an almost exclusively white community during most of its history; Alameda Street and Slauson Avenue, which were fiercely defended segregation lines in the 1950s, separated it from black areas.

The changes that shaped Los Angeles from the late 1970s onward—the decline of American manufacturing that began in the 1970s; the rapid growth of newer suburbs in Orange County, the eastern San Gabriel, western San Fernando and Conejo valleys; the collapse of the aerospace and defense industry at the end of the Cold War; and the implosion of the Southern California real estate boom in the early 1990s—resulted in the wholesale departure of virtually all of the white population of Huntington Park by the mid-1990s.  The vacuum was filled almost entirely by two groups of Latinos: upwardly mobile families eager to leave the barrios of East Los Angeles, and recent Mexican immigrants.  Today, Pacific Boulevard is once again a thriving commercial strip, serving as a major retail center for working-class residents of southeastern Los Angeles County—only now targeting a Hispanic public with many signs in Spanish.

Geography
Before California abolished judicial townships (some time after 1960), Huntington Park was located in San Antonio Township.

Cities surrounding Huntington Park include Bell, Cudahy, Los Angeles, Maywood, South Gate, and Vernon.

Climate 
On average, there are 286 sunny days per year in Huntington Park, California. Annually the snowfall is 0 inches. The July high is around 82 degrees. The January low is 48. As of 2015 the average high temperatures have risen ranging from the low to mid 90s (°F).

Demographics

2012
A 2012 study by the California Center for Public Health Advocacy found Huntington Park, California had the highest percentage of overweight children in all of California with 53% of the city's child population being obese or overweight.

2010 census
At the 2010 census Huntington Park had a population of 58,114. The racial and ethnic makeup of Huntington Park was 56,445 (97.1%) Hispanic or Latino, 29,776 (51.2%) White (1.6% Non-Hispanic White), 440 (0.8%) African American, 752 (1.3%) Native American, 393 (0.7%) Asian, 28 (0.0%) Pacific Islander, 24,535 (42.2%) from other races, and 2,190 (3.8%) from two or more races.

The census reported that 57,859 people (99.6% of the population) lived in households, 248 (0.4%) lived in non-institutionalized group quarters, and 7 (0%) were institutionalized.

There were 14,597 households, 8,581 (58.8%) had children under the age of 18 living in them, 7,461 (51.1%) were opposite-sex married couples living together, 3,212 (22.0%) had a female householder with no husband present, 1,623 (11.1%) had a male householder with no wife present.  There were 1,377 (9.4%) unmarried opposite-sex partnerships, and 81 (0.6%) same-sex married couples or partnerships. 1,644 households (11.3%) were one person and 694 (4.8%) had someone living alone who was 65 or older. The average household size was 3.96.  There were 12,296 families (84.2% of households); the average family size was 4.19.

The age distribution was 18,439 people (31.7%) under the age of 18, 6,984 people (12.0%) aged 18 to 24, 17,886 people (30.8%) aged 25 to 44, 10,942 people (18.8%) aged 45 to 64, and 3,863 people (6.6%) who were 65 or older.  The median age was 28.9 years. For every 100 females, there were 99.6 males.  For every 100 females age 18 and over, there were 97.8 males.

There were 15,151 housing units at an average density of 5,023.9 per square mile, of the occupied units 3,936 (27.0%) were owner-occupied and 10,661 (73.0%) were rented. The homeowner vacancy rate was 1.5%; the rental vacancy rate was 3.2%.  18,054 people (31.1% of the population) lived in owner-occupied housing units and 39,805 people (68.5%) lived in rental housing units.

During 2009–2013, Huntington Park had a median household income of $36,397, with 28.7% of the population living below the federal poverty line.

2000 census
According to the census of 2000, there were 61,348 people in 14,860 households, including 12,660 families, in the city. The population density was 20,252.4 inhabitants per square mile (7,817.4/km). The racial makeup of the city was 41.4% White, 0.8% Black or African American, 1.0% Native American, 0.80% Asian, 0.1% Pacific Islander, 51.1% from other races, and 4.9% from two or more races.  95.6% of the population were Hispanic or Latino of any race.

As of 2000, speakers of Spanish as their first language accounted for 90.77% of residents, while English was spoken by 9.17%, Chinese by 0.05% of the population.

Of the 14,860 households 58.3% had children under the age of 18 living with them, 55.4% were married couples living together, 20.3% had a female householder with no husband present, and 14.8% were non-families. 10.9% of households were one person and 4.8% were one person aged 65 or older.  The average household size was 4.12 and the average family size was 4.34.

The age distribution was 35.8% under the age of 18, 13.0% from 18 to 24, 32.3% from 25 to 44, 13.8% from 45 to 64, and 5.1% 65 or older.  The median age was 26 years. For every 100 females, there were 100.3 males.  For every 100 females age 18 and over, there were 98.3 males.

The median household income was $28,941 and the median family income  was $29,844. Males had a median income of $21,039 versus $16,733 for females. The per capita income for the city was $9,340.  About 23.3% of families and 25.2% of the population were below the poverty line, including 31.5% of those under age 18 and 18.7% of those age 65 or over.

Arts and culture

Pacific Boulevard

Architecture
Pacific Boulevard was the busiest shopping district in the southeastern Los Angeles suburbs from the 1930s through the 1950s
and boasted numerous department stores including the local Wineman's. Notable Streamline Moderne architecture includes the Lane-Wells Company Building and the W. W. Henry Company Building. Art Deco architecture is found in Huntington Park's commercial district, and include the former theaters along Pacific Blvd.  The 1,468 seat Warner Theater on Pacific Boulevard opened in 1930, and was designed by B. Marcus Priteca.  The California Theatre opened in 1925 and was operated by Fox Theatres as the Fox California Theatre. In the 1980s it was known as the California 3 Theatre. The theatre closed in 2006 and was later converted into a retail space. It was renamed California 2 Theatres and now there is a tuxedo shop along with other retail stores and restaurants. In 2019 the theater had been converted into a fitness center for recreational use.

Festival and fairs 
Pacific Boulevard, the commercial business street of Huntington Park, has been the location for festivals, carnival fairs and parades. The "Carnaval Primavera" is held each year for three days across nine blocks of Pacific Boulevard in Huntington Park.  The event features Central American and Mexican food, carnival rides, games, and live music.

Public libraries
County of Los Angeles Public Library operates the Huntington Park Library.

Government
In the Los Angeles County Board of Supervisors, Huntington Park is in the Fourth District, represented by Janice Hahn.

Education
Huntington Park is zoned to schools in the Los Angeles Unified School District.

Public elementary schools in Huntington Park include:

Hope Street Elementary School
Huntington Park New Elementary
Middleton Elementary School and Middleton New Primary Center
Miles Elementary School
Pacific Boulevard School
San Antonio Elementary School
Walnut Park Elementary School
Lucille Roybal- Allard Elementary School
 KIPP Comienza Community Prep
 Aspire: Antonio Maria Lugo Academy
 Aspire: Titan Academy
 Aspire: Junior Collegiate Academy
 Academia Moderna

Public middle schools include:

Gage Middle School
Nimitz Middle School
Centennial College Preparatory Academy
 Aspire: Ollin University Preparatory Academy
 Walnut Park Middle School
 Prepa Tec
 KIPP Comienza Community Prep

Public high schools include:

 Huntington Park High School
 Alliance Collins Family College Ready High School
 Aspire Pacific Academy
 Linda Esperanza Marquez High School
 Maywood Academy High School
 Alliance Margaret M. Bloomfield High School
 Diego Rivera Learning Complex

In addition Pacific Boulevard Special Education Center (ungraded) is in the city.

Private schools include:
 Church of the Nazarene School
 St. Matthias Catholic Elementary School
 Interamerican Adult School

Infrastructure

Emergency services
Fire protection in Huntington Park is provided by the Los Angeles County Fire Department. The Huntington Park Police Department provides law enforcement.

Transportation
Bus services are provided by both the Los Angeles County Metropolitan Transportation Authority, and Huntington Park's own COMBI bus service. Slauson station and Florence station on the Metro A Line are near the city.

Notable people
 Lois Andrews - actress, notable for her portrayal of the comics character Dixie Dugan.
 Elton Gallegly - former US Representative, California's 24th District.
 Leon Leyson - youngest person on Schindler's List, taught at Huntington Park High School.
 Rosario Marin - 41st Treasurer of the United States and a former mayor of Huntington Park.
 Lorenzo Mata - professional basketball player.
 Jeremy McKinney - professional football player.
 Wilbur Nelson  - minister at Grace Church of Huntington Park and radio broadcaster
 Slayer - American Thrash metal band originated out of Huntington Park
 Tim Wallach - professional baseball player.
 Terry Wilson - stuntman and actor, noted for his role as "Bill Hawks" on the television series Wagon Train.
 Tex Winter - basketball coach.

See also

 South Central Los Angeles

References

External links

 
Cities in Los Angeles County, California
Chicano and Mexican neighborhoods in California
Gateway Cities
Streetcar suburbs
Incorporated cities and towns in California
Populated places established in 1906
1906 establishments in California